'The Rev. Don McCrossan (1908-1989) was an evangelist who in 1943 became director of the Victory Service Club, an outreach ministry to military personnel established the previous year by the Union Rescue Mission in Los Angeles. As his obituary explains, “Through World War II and the Korean and Vietnam wars, [the VSC] was a place where young men and women in a strange city could gather for food and friendship. It also was a place of faith, McCrossan said in a 1961 interview, a place where tens of thousands formally accepted Christ and hundreds more were inspired to enter various ministries.” (LA Times, April 15, 1989). According to the URM website, the Victory Service Club was “a spiritual haven and gathering place for nearly two million servicemen during the war years.” McCrossan served as director until his retirement in 1975.
McCrossan was also a singer and a composer of gospel songs and held down a side job as radio announcer on station KGER in Long Beach, California. He secured the copyright to “On the Jericho Road” in 1928 when he was only 20.

On the Jericho Road was written in 1928 by Don and Marguerete McCrossan and recorded by Elvis Presley. 

A version of the song was recorded in 2000 by James Blackwood.

References 

Elvis Presley songs
1928 songs